Délia Tétreault, M.I.C., also known as Mother Marie of the Holy Spirit, (February 4, 1865–October 1, 1941) was a Canadian Religious Sister. Though she never left her homeland, she felt called to serve the needy of the world, for which purpose she founded the Missionary Sisters of the Immaculate Conception in 1902, the first missionary congregation of Canadian origin. The cause for her beatification is under study by the Holy See.

Early life
She was born in Marieville, Quebec, on 4 February 1865. She and her twin brother Roch were among the nine children of Alexis Tétreault, a farmer, and his wife, Céline Ponton. She had a weak constitution and was usually sick but it was Roch who died seven months later. Two years after that loss, her mother died. Her father then decided to emigrate to the United States to find a living and she was taken in by her aunt, Julie Ponton, and her husband, Jean Alix.

Tétreault was raised in a very religious household. When she was a child, she would hide in the attic where she would read through the stacks of copies of the periodicals published by the Propagation of the Faith and the Holy Childhood Association, both founded to promote the support of the missionary activity of the Catholic Church in Asia and Africa. For her education, her aunt enrolled her in a school in the village run by the Sisters of the Presentation of Mary.

One night the young Tétreault had a very significant dream. She was kneeling by her bed when all at once, she saw a wheat field. The heads of the wheat each changed to heads of children from different parts of the world. At the age of 13, she begin to feel a calling to the religious life as part of this call to serve the needy of the earth. At the age of 15, she made the vow of perpetual chastity.

Religious life
Deciding to act upon her sense of calling, at the age of 18, Tétreault asked to join the Carmelite monastery of Montreal but they refused her. She then applied to the Sisters of Charity of Saint-Hyacinthe, who accepted her as a postulant. However her poor health soon brought her back to her uncle's home. During that time, she felt confirmed in her call to establish some form of missionary service for Canadian women as the Paris Foreign Missions Society had provided to Canada in the early centuries of its development.

Foundress
In 1891, Tétreault joined the Sisters of Bethany and stayed there for 10 years. It was during her time serving in a poor neighborhood of Montreal that she realized her dream of an apostolic school for women and a seminary for the foreign missions. Around this time, she met Father Gustave Bourassa who was her guide and led her to all the important persons she needed to fulfill her dreams. In 1902, Paul Bruchési, the Archbishop of Montreal gave permission for the founding of the congregation. Two years later, he went to Rome and spoke to Pope Pius X about this new foundation. The pope immediately answered, "Found, found, and all the blessings of Heaven will fall upon this new Institute and you will call them the Missionary Sisters of the Immaculate Conception."

In 1905, Tétreault took religious vows for the first time and the religious name of Mother Marie of the Holy Spirit. In 1909, the first six Sisters of the new congregation left for Canton, China. Within a short time, several convents opened throughout Quebec to provide support for the missions of the congregation. In 1920, they launched a missionary review, Le Précurseur. On 2 February 1921 the school of formation for the foreign missions began to operate. By 1933, the foundress had established 36 communities of the Missionary Sisters in Canada, China, Japan and the Philippines.

In 1933, Tétreault became seriously ill. She died on 1 October 1941 and her body lay in state for four days at the motherhouse of the congregation. Approximately one thousand people came to pray over her remains. She was buried in the cemetery on the grounds of the motherhouse on 7 October.

Veneration
In 1958 the first steps were taken to obtain Tétreault's beatification by the Vatican. In 1982, Cardinal Paul Grégoire, then the Archbishop of Montreal, approved the process in view of the introduction of the cause in Rome. The canonical closure of the diocesan proceedings took place in 1997 and the cause was accepted by Rome for further study.

Presently the Missionary Sisters of the Immaculate Conception are in 13 countries and of 17 nationalities, including 582 professed sisters and 87 sisters in initial formation.

References

1865 births
1941 deaths
People from Montérégie
Founders of Catholic religious communities
Canadian Roman Catholic religious sisters and nuns
Female Roman Catholic missionaries
Burials in Quebec
Venerated Catholics by Pope John Paul II
Canadian Roman Catholic missionaries
Roman Catholic missionaries in Canada